Al-Mughraqa (also known as Abu Middein) is a Palestinian town in the Gaza Governorate of the Gaza Strip, located six kilometers southwest of Gaza City. According to the Palestinian Central Bureau of Statistics (PCBS), al-Mughraqa had a population of 5,075 in 2006. The town's alternate name, "Abu Middein" derives from the Bedouin Abu Middein tribe that inhabits the area, part of the larger al-Hanajreh tribal confederation.

References

Towns in the Gaza Strip
Municipalities of the State of Palestine
Bedouins in the State of Palestine